Tessy Alfonso, better known by her stage name Sampaguita, is a Pinoy rock singer from the Philippines, active during the 1970s and 1980s. Sampaguita had released several albums and songs that went successful and are now considered classics. She is also dubbed as the "Queen of Filipino rock music."

Origins
Sampaguita started out as a model under then-First Lady Imelda Romualdez-Marcos' Bagong Anyo. She was discovered by her then-husband Nilo Santos. Her stage name was coined by the percussionist Nick Boogie, after the species of jasmine locally known as sampaguita, which is also the national flower. Her first performance was at the New Moon Concert in 1977 at the Folk Arts Theater in Pasay, Metro Manila.

Present 
In 1994, Alfonso retired from the Philippine music scene when according to her own words: "[Life became] too dangerous, with sex, drugs and rock and roll, rock until you drop."

In 1996, She released an album "Laguna".

On December 3, 2010, she went onstage again at the Ugat, The Legends of Pinoy Folk Rock concert held at the Araneta Coliseum. She performed along with other Filipino rock artists from the 1970s and 1980s.

Personal life 
Alfonso is the mother of three children: Dolly and Kowboy Santos (with Nilo Santos), and Jacinta Romero (with Miguel Romero). Kowboy Santos, is also a musician, and is the frontman of the band Generation. Alfonso currently resides in Parañaque with Romero and their daughter, Jacinta.

Discography

Albums

Songs

 Babalik Sa Iyo
 Beat Wave
 Blind Date
 Bonggahan
 CB Gypsy
 Chance to Change
 Children No Longer Young
 Crazy Tonite
 Easy Pare
 Estudyante Blues
 Go Find Another One
 Hanggang Saan
 I'm Behind You
 I'm Sorry
 Kumadre
 Laguna
 Liwanag
 Mahamantra
 Mahilig
 Napupuyat
 New Moon Dance
 No Guidance
 Nosi Ba Lasi (Hit Single 1989) 
 Para Sa Iyo
 Sa Diyos Lamang
 Sa Isip Di Mabura
 Salamat
 Sayawan
 Takipsilim
 Tao
 The Party
 Uling

Music

 Salamat
 Tao

Lyrics

 Salamat
 Tao
 Babalik Sa Iyo
 CB Gypsy
 I'm Behind You
 Kumadre
 Liwanag
 Salamat
 Sayawan
 Tao

See also
Asin
Freddie Aguilar
Juan de la Cruz Band
Mike Hanopol

References

External links
Bonggahan by Sampaguita from on YouTube
Nosi Ba Lasi by Sampaguita from on YouTube

20th-century Filipino women singers
Filipino rock singers
Rock songwriters
Filipino songwriters
Living people
Year of birth missing (living people)